The Carcinomycetaceae are a family of fungi in the order Tremellales. The family currently contains a single genus. Some species produce filamentous sexual states with basidia and are parasites of other fungi. Some, however, are only known from their yeast states.

References

Tremellomycetes
Carcinomycetaceae
Taxa named by Franz Oberwinkler
Taxa described in 1982